The Yentna River (Dena'ina: Yentnu) is a river in South Central Alaska, formed by its East Fork and West Fork at , flows South-East to Susitna River,  North-West of Anchorage, Alaska; Cook Inlet Low.

History 
Tanaina Indian name reported by Spurr (1900, p. 46), United States Geological Survey.
"Sometimes called Johnson River after the first white man to ascend it."

Watershed 

Tributaries 
From mouth to source:
Kahiltna River , Elevation: 
Bottle Creek (Yentna River) , Elevation: 
Skwentna River , Elevation: 
East Fork Yentna River , Elevation: 
West Fork Yentna River , Elevation: 
Lake Creek just about 8 miles down river from Bottle Creek. Major fishing area: kings, reds, silvers. Winter sports, hunting. 
Moose Creek, Indian Creek, Fish lakes Creek, Hewitt Creek, Malone's Slough, Donkey Creek, Johnson Creek, Clearwater Creek, Rich Creek, Flag Creek, Delta Creek, Fourth of July Creek, & Kichatna River round out the rest of the main Yentna River Tributaries.

See also 
List of rivers of Alaska

References 

Rivers of Matanuska-Susitna Borough, Alaska
Rivers of Alaska